Mapulang Lupa National High School is a public secondary school located in Valenzuela City.  Formerly known as Valenzuela National High School - Mapulang Lupa Annex, it was established in 2003 and gain its independent status on September 13, 2006 through House Bill #5776 (3RS-13 C) sponsored by the late Congressman Antonio M. Serapio together with then Albay representative Joey S. Salceda and Negros Occidental representative Jose Carlos V. Lacson during the 13th Congress.  The current school principal is Mr. Rudy Fran Falcunitin.

Principal of the school
 Genindina M. Sumbillo (2003 - 2006)
 Lagrimas B. Bayle    (2006 - 2009)
 Meliton P. Zurbano (2009 - 2013)
 Eddie A. Alarte (2013 - 2016)
 Edelina I. Golloso (2016–July 2, 2018)
 Rudy Fran Falcunitin (July 2, 2018 – present)

Department heads
Filipino: Roderick O. Alo
English: Maria Liza R. Cantiga
Mathematics: Erlinda S. Dela Vega
Science & Technology: Ritchel G. Galo
Araling Panlipunan: Janis A. Jose
Edukasyon sa Pagpapakatao: Rudolf S. Ng
T. L. E.: Clarissa O. Daco 
MAPEH: Rosalia R. Santillan

Curriculum

K+12 basic education curriculum

Grade 7
  

Grade 8
  

Grade 9
  

Grade 10

See also
Education in Valenzuela City
Valenzuela City

References

External links 

 Official Website

High schools in Metro Manila
Schools in Valenzuela, Metro Manila
Educational institutions established in 2003
Public schools in Metro Manila
2003 establishments in the Philippines